ENZSO 2 is the second release by the ENZSO project led by Eddie Rayner. The orchestral recording sessions were held at Symphony House in Wellington and National Radio Studios for the National Youth Choir. The cover art continues with the orchestral theme from the previous album. Unlike the first ENZSO album, Tim and Neil Finn did not make appearances.

Track listing
"Pioneer" (Instrumental)
"Six Months in a Leaky Boat" (Instrumental)
"History Never Repeats" performed by Jon Stevens
"One Step Ahead" performed by Bic Runga
"The Devil You Know" performed by Dave Dobbyn
"Shark Attack" performed by Sam Hunt
"I Walk Away" performed by Jon Stevens
"Semi-Detached" performed by Margaret Urlich
"Maybe" performed by Dave Dobbyn
"Bon Voyage" performed by Dame Kiri Te Kanawa
"Frenzy" (Instrumental)

Charts

Weekly charts

References

1999 albums
Enzso albums